Denver is an unincorporated community and coal town in  Johnson County, Kentucky, United States. Its post office closed in October 2002.

References

Unincorporated communities in Johnson County, Kentucky
Unincorporated communities in Kentucky
Coal towns in Kentucky